During the 1992–93 English football season, Chelsea F.C. competed in the inaugural season of the FA Premier League.

The season was the club's 88th year in existence since their foundation in 1905. It was their 58th season within England's highest tier of football and their fourth season of their current top-flight spell following promotion at the end of the 1988–89 season.

Season summary
Chelsea started the season well and stood second after 19 games, but went into freefall after that, going 12 matches without a win, a run that pulled Chelsea down to 12th, replacing hopes of a title challenge with relegation fears. Manager Ian Porterfield paid for the team's poor form by becoming the first manager to be sacked in the new Premier League on 15 February. He was replaced by David Webb, the scorer of the Chelsea winner that won the 1970 FA Cup Final. Webb managed to steer Chelsea to safety, but his contract was not renewed by the board. Instead, they appointed former Tottenham legend Glenn Hoddle, who had just taken Swindon Town to their first ever top-flight campaign, as player-manager.

The club ended the season with 56 points, having won 14, drawn 14 and lost 14 matches.  By finishing 11th of 22 clubs, it was Chelsea's first top-half finish since coming 5th in 1989–90. With 54 goals conceded, this was Chelsea's best defence in the top flight, a record broken next season as well.

Chelsea went out in the third round of the FA Cup this season, beaten 2–1 by Middlesbrough away at Ayresome Park.

Kit
Chelsea retained the previous season's home kit, manufactured by Umbro and sponsored by Commodore. It featured a geometric pattern on the players' right shoulder, repeated on the left leg of the shorts, an Umbro trademark of the time also used by Everton and Manchester United's  home shirts of the same time. For this season, Chelsea re-introduced white socks as first choice for the first time since 1984–85. White socks had been introduced by Tommy Docherty for Chelsea in 1965, to make Chelsea stand out among other clubs wearing blue shirts, white shorts and blue socks.

The away kit was based on football kits of the game's early days as part of a nostalgia craze following the 1990 World Cup. It was a white shirt with red pinstripes, red shorts and socks. Its laces were also worn on the Umbro home kits of Aston Villa and Sheffield United. The Chelsea lion badge was included in a blue shield; the kits for next season retained this style. The kit was the final one in which Chelsea wore a red garment, the colour having been a popular away kit throughout the 1970s and 1980s.

Chelsea wore a third kit of all-yellow with a blue collar and pattern on the front, also worn by Everton. The kit was from an Umbro range called Porto.

Transfers

In

Final league table

Results
Chelsea's score comes first

Legend

FA Premier League

FA Cup

League Cup

First-team squad

.

Left club during season

References

Chelsea F.C. seasons
Chelsea